Group B of the 2013 Fed Cup Europe/Africa Zone Group I was one of four pools in the Europe/Africa zone of the 2013 Fed Cup. Four teams competed in a round robin competition, with the top team and the bottom team proceeding to their respective sections of the play-offs: the top team played for advancement to the World Group II Play-offs, while the bottom team faced potential relegation to Group II.

Standings

Round-robin

Great Britain vs. Bosnia and Herzegovina

Portugal vs. Hungary

Great Britain vs. Portugal

Hungary vs. Bosnia and Herzegovina

Great Britain vs. Hungary

Portugal vs. Bosnia and Herzegovina

References

External links 
 Fed Cup website

2013 Fed Cup Europe/Africa Zone